Khwaja Ghulam Farid or Khwaja Fareed (1845–1901) was a 19th-century Sufi poet from Punjab. He was a member of the Chishti Nizami Sufi order. He wrote poetry in several languages, and his literary heritage has been claimed by both the Punjabi and the Saraiki language movements.

Early life
Farid's mother died when he was four years old and he was orphaned around the age of eight when his father, Khwaja Khuda Bakhsh, died. He was then brought up by his elder brother, Khwaja Fakhr-ud-Din, also known as Khwaja Fakhr Jehan Sain, and grew up to become a scholar and writer. He wrote kafi poems in several languages.

Sadeq Mohammad Khan III Nawab of Bahawalpur took Farid to his palace at Ahmedpur East for his religious education by a scholar, when he was 8 years old. His brother Fakhr-ud-Din, who had brought him up after his parents' deaths, also died when Farid was 28 years old. Farid then left for the Cholistan Desert (also known as Rohi) for chilla (retreat) where he lived for 18 years. Most of his work includes mentioning of the beauty of this place.

Farid performed hajj (pilgrimage to Mecca) in 1876.

Works
His most significant works include:
 Diwan-e-Farid
 Manaqabe Mehboobia (in Persian prose)
 Fawaid Faridia (in Persian prose)

In his poetry, he frequently uses the symbolism of a desert. Namely, he discusses how beautiful the desert is and how it attracted him to stay there for 18 years and how he believed that made him feel close to Muhammad. His work however does also include slightly touching the topic of political affairs, opposing the British rule in Bahawalpur state, writing a letter to the Nawab of Bahawalpur and also mentioning it in some of his poetry.

Legacy 

The 20th century saw the development of a branch of literary studies on Farid's life and work called Fareediyat.
Today, many religious and educational institutions in Pakistan and India are named after Farid (e.g., Khawaja Farid Government College,khawaja farid University of engineering and information technology in Rahimyar Khan, Pakistan) as are streets and town living quarters.
A literary award named after Farid – the Khwaja Ghulam Farid Award – is awarded yearly by the Pakistan Academy of Letters in literature, its recipients including Ismail Ahmedani (in 2013) and Irshad Taunsvi (in 2007) among others.
 In 2001, on Farid's 100th death anniversary (urs), Pakistan Post issued a memorial stamp to honour him in its "Poets of Pakistan" series
Sadiq Public School, the public school built by Nawab Sadeq Mohammad Khan V in Bahawalpur, has a house for the day scholars of the prep section named after Farid, called Fareed House.
Fareed Gate is the name of one of the historic gates surrounding the old city of Bahawalpur named in Farid's honour.
The Khawaja Fareed University of Engineering and Information Technology (KFUEIT) in Rahim Yar Khan District was named after Farid.
 Shrine of Khawaja Ghulam Farid in Rajanpur, Punjab is among the 10 most visited shrines in Pakistan.

See also 
Fariduddin Ganjshakar
Punjabi literature
 Qari Muhammad Muslehuddin Siddiqui
 Pathanay Khan
 Christopher Shackle

References

External links

 The complete works of Khwaja Farid in Punjabi on Academy of the Punjab in North America website

1845 births
1901 deaths
Sufi mystics
Sufi poets
People from British India
Punjabi Sufi saints
Poets from Punjab, Pakistan
19th-century poets
People from Rahim Yar Khan District
Punjabi-language poets
Punjabi-language writers
Chishti Order
Punjabi people
Indian poets